A pep rally, pep assembly or pep session is a gathering of people, typically students of middle school, high school, and college age, before a sports event.  The purpose of such a gathering is to encourage school spirit and to support members of the team.  It is generally seen as an American and Canadian phenomenon, used to create hype before a sporting event.

See also
 Pep talk

References

cheerleading
sports culture